Hellinsia confusus is a moth of the family Pterophoridae that is found in North America, including California.

The larvae have been recorded feeding on Baccharis pilularis.

References

confusus
Endemic fauna of the United States
Moths of North America
Fauna of California
Moths described in 1930